Connotations: A Journal for Critical Debate is a peer-reviewed open-access academic journal that was established in 1991 covering the field of English literature (from the Middle English period to the present), as well as American and other literatures in English. It is published by the Connotations Society for Critical Debate in collaboration with Waxmann Verlag (Münster/New York). The society was founded in 1998 and is formed by the private subscribers to the journal and organizes biennial symposia. As of 2013, the editors-in-chief are Inge Leimberg (University of Münster), Matthias Bauer (Tübingen University), Burkhard Niederhoff (Ruhr University Bochum), and Angelika Zirker (Tübingen University). The journal is abstracted and indexed in the MLA Bibliography, the World Shakespeare Bibliography and the International Bibliography of Periodical Literature.

External links 

Connotations Society for Critical Debate

Literary magazines published in Germany
Continuous journals
Publications established in 1991
English-language journals
Creative Commons Attribution-licensed journals